Kisumu Ndogo is a name given to "villages" (or settlements) that are part of two informal settlements in Nairobi, Kenya, Kibera and Korogocho. Kisumu Ndogo means little Kisumu.

The original settlers of Kisumu Ndogo in Kibera were from the Kisumu area in western Kenya, and that settlement has a major Luo population. A Winners' Chapel is active in Kisumu Ndogo. The Kenya Water for Health Organisation (KWAHO) is active in Kisumu Ndogo. Other parts of Kibera include Laini Saba, Lindi, Makina, Kianda, Mashimoni, Soweto East, Gatwekera and Siranga.

Korogocho includes the villages of Korogocho A, Korogocho B, Kisumu Ndogo, Gitathuru, Highridge, Grogan A, Grogan B and Nyayo.

References

Suburbs of Nairobi
Slums in Kenya
Squatting in Kenya